Separatista flavida is a species of sea snail, a marine gastropod mollusk in the family Capulidae.

Description

References

 
 Drivas, J. & M. Jay (1988). Coquillages de La Réunion et de l'île Maurice

External links

Capulidae
Gastropods described in 1843